Tabernero is a Spanish-language occupational surname literally meaning "tavern keeper". Notable people with the surname include:

Alfonso Sánchez-Tabernero
Javier Martínez Tabernero
, (born 1961), Spanish film director and screenwriter

Spanish-language surnames